Invest Hong Kong is the department of the Hong Kong SAR Government responsible for Foreign Direct Investment, supporting overseas businesses to set up and expand in Hong Kong. Founded on July 1, 2000, its first Director General was Michael Rowse.

The Investment Officers are organized into nine specialist sector teams covering Hong Kong's four pillar industries and six new growth sectors: Business & Professional Services, Consumer Products, Creative Industries, Financial Services, FinTech, Information & Communications Technology, Innovation & Technology, Tourism & Transport,  and hospitality, Infrastructure & Advanced Manufacturing.

Invest HK is headed by the Director-General of Investment Promotion who reports to the Secretary for Commerce and Economic Development.

Director-General of Investment Promotion 
The current Director-General of Investment Promotion is Stephen Phillips.

In August 2022, Phillips went to Australia and New Zealand to market Hong Kong's business attractions. In November 2022, despite the 0+3 restrictions for inbound travelers, Phillips said that "Hong Kong is well and truly back open for business."

National Security Law 
In March 2022, Phillips claimed that the National Security Law was not a big concern for companies while investing in Hong Kong.

Hong Kong FinTech Week
Hong Kong FinTech Week is an international fintech event, organized by Investhk; It is held in Hong Kong (and Shenzhen).

Hong Kong FinTech Week brings together fintech communities from the East and the West that seek to expand their businesses to Hong Kong, mainland China and the Asia-Pacific region.

See also
Investment promotion agency
China Investment Promotion Agency

References

Hong Kong government departments and agencies
Investment promotion agencies